Kamil Kalka (born 28 May 1981 in Wągrowiec) is a Polish race walker.

Achievements

References

1981 births
Living people
Polish male racewalkers
People from Wągrowiec
Sportspeople from Greater Poland Voivodeship